Papenbrook is a surname. Notable people with the surname include:

 Bob Papenbrook (1955–2006), American voice actor
 Bryce Papenbrook (born 1986), American voice actor